Tolimán Municipality may refer to:
 Tolimán Municipality, Jalisco
 Tolimán Municipality, Querétaro

Municipality name disambiguation pages